Serologically defined colon cancer antigen 8 is a protein that in humans is encoded by the SDCCAG8 gene. This protein localizes to the centrioles.

Clinical significance 

Mutations in SDCCAG8 have been found to cause nephronophthisis-related ciliopathies.

Interactions
SDCCAG8 has been shown to interact directly with OFD1, a protein that is also associated with nephronophthisis-related ciliopathies.

References

Further reading